Équipe autonomiste is a Quebec autonomist provincial political party in Quebec, Canada. It was officially recognized on March 21, 2012 by the Chief Electoral Officer of Quebec.

The party was founded by Éric Barnabé, a former member of the Action démocratique du Québec (ADQ), who had served as the president of a riding association. It was founded in response to the merger of the ADQ with the Coalition Avenir Québec (CAQ).

Équipe autonomiste ran seventeen candidates in the 2012 Quebec provincial election, and fielded candidates in the subsequent elections in 2014, 2018 and 2022.

Election results

Leaders
Éric Barnabé     since 2012, March 21
Gérald Nicolas   since 2012, May 11
Guy Boivin       since 2012, June 27
Stéphan Pouleur  since 2016, August 4
Steve Thérion  since 2022, October 27

References

External links
Official website

Conservative parties in Canada
2012 establishments in Quebec
Political parties established in 2012
Provincial political parties in Quebec